R.S.C. Anderlecht Superleague Formula team is the racing team of R.S.C. Anderlecht, a football team that competes in Belgium in the Belgian First Division. The R.S.C. Anderlecht racing team competes in the Superleague Formula. It was operated in 2008 by Team Astromega and will be operated by former Formula One team Zakspeed during the 2009 season.

2008 season
In the 2008 Superleague Formula season R.S.C. Anderlecht finished overall in 6th place in the standings. Craig Dolby was the driver in the car for all the races. The team's best finish was 2nd which they posted 3 times.

2009 season
R.S.C. Anderlecht will be competing with Yelmer Buurman as driver, who finished 2nd for PSV Eindhoven in the previous season. Craig Dolby will not be returning as he has been confirmed as the driver of Tottenham Hotspur Zakspeed will now operate the team.

Record
(key)

2008

2009
Super Final results in 2009 did not count for points towards the main championship.

2010

References

External links
 R.S.C. Anderlecht Superleague Formula team minisite
 Official R.S.C. Anderlecht football club website

R.S.C. Anderlecht
Superleague Formula club teams
2008 establishments in Belgium